The 2019–20 Saudi Second Division was the 44th season of the Saudi Second Division since its establishment in 1976. Fixtures were released on 5 August 2019 and the opening round of matches was played on 11 October 2019. The league season was scheduled to conclude on 10 April 2020 with the final but was postponed due to the COVID-19 pandemic in Saudi Arabia.

On 7 March 2020, the Ministry of Sports announced that all matches would be played behind closed doors until further notice. On 14 March 2020, the Ministry suspended all sports competitions indefinitely due to the COVID-19 pandemic in Saudi Arabia. On 11 June 2020, the Ministry of Sports announced the resumption of sports activities with training starting on 21 June and games starting after 4 August 2020 and played behind closed doors. On 1 July 2020, the schedule for the remaining matches was released. It was announced that the league would resume on 13 August 2020 and end on 12 September 2020.

On 12 September 2020, Hajer defeated Al-Diriyah 1–0 in the final to win their second title.

Team changes
A total of 24 teams are contesting the league, including 16 sides from the 2018–19 season, 4 relegated teams from the MS League, and 4 promoted teams from the 2018–19 Third Division.

The following teams have changed division since the 2018–19 season

To Second Division

Promoted from the Third Division

 Al-Safa
 Al-Rawdhah
 Al-Entesar
 Al-Anwar

Relegated from MS League
 Al-Qaisumah
 Hajer
 Al-Washm
 Al-Orobah

From Second Division
Promoted to MS League
 Hetten
 Al-Bukayriyah
 Al-Thoqbah
 Al-Taqadom

Relegated to the Third Division
 Al-Hait
 Al-Muzahimiyyah
 Al-Watani
 Al-Ghazwah

Teams
;Group A

Group B

Foreign players
The number of foreign players is limited to 2 per team.

Players name in bold indicates the player is registered during the mid-season transfer window.

Group A
Table

Group B
Table

Third place play-off
Al-Sahel, who finished 2nd in Group A faced Arar who finished 2nd in Group B to decide the third-placed team.

Final

The winners of each group played a one-legged final to decide the champion of the 2019–20 Second Division. As winners of Group A, Hajer will face Al-Diriyah, the winners of Group B. Hajer defeated Al-Diriyah to win their second title.

Statistics

Top scorers

Hat-tricks

See also
 2019–20 Professional League
 2019–20 Prince Mohammad bin Salman League

References

3
Saudi Second Division seasons
Saudi Arabia, 3